Up from Slavery is the 1901 autobiography of American educator Booker T. Washington (1856–1915). The book describes his experience of working to rise up from being enslaved as a child during the Civil War, the obstacles he overcame to get an education at the new Hampton Institute, and his work establishing vocational schools like the Tuskegee Institute in Alabama to help Black people and other persecuted people of color learn useful, marketable skills and work to pull themselves, as a race, up by the bootstraps. He reflects on the generosity of teachers and philanthropists who helped educate Black and Native Americans. He describes his efforts to instill manners, breeding, health and dignity into students. His educational philosophy stresses combining academic subjects with learning a trade (reminiscent of John Ruskin). Washington explained that the integration of practical subjects is partly designed to "reassure the White community of the usefulness of educating Black people".

This book was first published as a serial in 1900 through The Outlook, a Christian newspaper of New York. It was serialized so that Washington could receive feedback from his audience during the writing and could adapt his work to his diverse audience.

Washington was a controversial figure during his lifetime, and W. E. B. Du Bois, among others, criticized some of his views. The book was a best-seller, and remained the most popular African-American autobiography until that of Malcolm X. In 1998, the Modern Library listed the book at No. 3 on its list of the 100 best nonfiction books of the 20th century, and in 1999 it was also listed by the conservative Intercollegiate Review as one of the "50 Best Books of the Twentieth Century".

Plot summary 
Up from Slavery chronicles more than forty years of Washington's life: from slave to schoolmaster to the face of southern race relations. In this text, Washington climbs the social ladder through hard, manual labor, a decent education, and relationships with great people. Throughout the text, he stresses the importance of education for the black population as a reasonable tactic to ease race relations in the South (particularly in the context of Reconstruction).

The book is in essence Washington's traditional, non-confrontational message supported by the example of his life.

Major themes 
 Education
 What it means to be your own person 
 Industriousness
 Humility 
 The people's capacity for change 
 Poverty among the black population

Chapter summaries

Chapter 1 
"A Slave Among Slaves": In the first chapter, the reader is given a vivid yet brief sight of the life of slaves, as seen from the author's point of view. Basically, it speaks of the hardships the slaves endured before independence and their joys and hassles (arguments) after liberty. The first chapter explains about his suffering in that plantation and the end days of his slavery. The author feels that his life had its beginning in midst of the most miserable surroundings.
He explains about his living conditions, and how his mother works hard to make the days end.

Chapter 2 
"Boyhood Days": In the second chapter, the reader learns the importance of naming oneself as a means of reaffirming freedom and the extent to which freed men and women would go to reunite their families. After families had reunited and named themselves, they would then seek out employment (often far from their former masters). The reader learns the story behind the author's name: Booker Taliaferro Washington. The second chapter also gives an account of cruel labour of both adults and children in the mines at the city of Malden.
Furthermore, Booker is strongly attracted towards education and oscillates between the extensive schedule of the day's work and the school. The second chapter also describes the character of Booker's mother and her role in his life.

Chapter 3 

"The Struggle for Education": Washington struggles, in this chapter, to earn enough money to reach and remain at Hampton Institute. That was his first experience related to the importance of willingness to do manual labor. The first introduction of General Samuel C. Armstrong

Chapter 4 
"Helping Others": Conditions at Hampton are discussed in this chapter, as well as Washington's first trip home from school. He returns early from vacation to aid teachers in the cleaning of their classrooms. When Washington returns the next summer, he is elected to teach local students, young and old, through a night school, Sunday school, and private lessons. This chapter also gives the first mention of groups such as the Ku Klux Klan.

Chapter 5 
"The Reconstruction Period (1867-1878)": Washington paints an image of the South during Reconstruction Era of the United States, with several assessments of Reconstruction projects including: education, vocational opportunities, and voting rights. He speaks of the Reconstruction policy being built on "a false foundation." He seeks to play a role in forming a more solid foundation based upon "the hand, head, and heart."

Chapter 6 
"Black Race and Red Race": General Armstrong calls Washington back to Hampton Institute for the purpose of instructing and advising a group of young Native-American men. Washington speaks about different instances of racism against Native Americans and African Americans. Washington also begins a night school at this time.

Chapter 7 
"Early Days at Tuskegee": Once again General Armstrong is instrumental in encouraging Washington's next project: the establishment of a normal school for African Americans in Tuskegee, Alabama. He describes the conditions in Tuskegee and his work in building the school: "much like making bricks without straw." Washington also outlines a typical day in the life of an African American living in the country at this time.
In May 1881, General Armstrong told Washington he had received a letter from a man in Alabama to recommend someone to take charge of a "colored school" in Tuskegee. The man writing the letter thought that there was no "colored" person to fill the role and asked him to recommend a white man. The general wrote back to tell him about Washington, and he was accepted for the position.
 
Washington went there and describes Tuskegee as a town of 2,000 population and as being in the "Black Belt" of the South, where nearly half of the residents were "colored" and in other parts of nearby counties there were six African-American people to one white person. He explains that he thinks the term "Black Belt" originated from the rich, dark soil of the area, which was also the part of the South where slaves were most profitable.
 
Once at Tuskegee, his first task was to find a place to open the school and secured a rundown "shanty" and African-American Methodist church. He also travelled around the area and acquainted himself with the local people. He describes some of the families he met and who worked in the cotton fields. He saw that most of the farmers were in debt and schools were generally taught in churches or log cabins and these had few or no provisions. Some, for example, had no means of heating in the winter and one school had one book to share between five children. 
He goes on to relate the story of a man aged around 60. He told Washington he had been sold in 1845 and there had been five of them: "There were five of us; myself and brother and three mules." Washington explains he is referring to these experiences to highlight how improvements were later made.

Chapter 8 
"Teaching School in a Stable and a Hen-house": Washington details the necessity of a new form of education for the children of Tuskegee, for the typical New England education would not be sufficient to effect uplift. Here is also the introduction of long-time partners, George W. Campbell and Lewis Adams, and future wife, Olivia A. Davidson; these individuals felt similarly to Washington in that mere book-learning would not be enough. The goal was established to prepare students of Tuskegee to become teachers, farmers, and overall moral people.
Washington's first days at Tuskegee are described in this chapter, as is his method of working. He demonstrates a holistic approach to his teaching in that he researched the area and the people and how poverty stricken many were. His visits also showed how education was both a premium and underfunded, and therefore justifies the setting up of this new facility.
 
Tuskegee is also seen to be set in a rural area, where agriculture was the main form of employment, and so the institute's later incarnation as an industrial school that was fit for teaching its students skills for the locale is justified.
He encountered difficulties in setting up the school, which he opened on July 4, 1881, and this included some opposition from white people who questioned the value of educating African Americans: "These people feared the result of education would be that the Negros would leave the farms, and that it would be difficult to secure them for domestic service."
 
He describes how he has depended on the advice of two men in particular and these were the ones who wrote to General Armstrong asking for a teacher. One is a white man and a former slave holder called George W. Campbell. The other is a "black" man and a former slave called Lewis Adams.
 
When the school opened they had 30 students and these were divided roughly equally between the sexes. Many more had wanted to come, but it had been decided that they must be over 15 and have had some education already. Many who came were public school teachers and some were around 40 years of age. The number of pupils increased each week and there were nearly 50 by the end of the first month.

A co-teacher came at the end of the first six weeks. This was Olivia A. Davidson and she later became his wife. She had been taught in Ohio and came South as she had heard of the need for teachers. She is described as brave in the way she nursed the sick when others would not (such as caring for a boy with smallpox). She also trained further at Hampton and then at Massachusetts State Normal School at Framingham.

She and Washington agreed that the students needed more than a "book education" and they thought they must show them how to care for their bodies and how to earn a living after they had left the school. They tried to educate them in a way that would make them want to stay in these agricultural districts (rather than leave for the city and be forced to live by their wits). Many of the students came initially to study so that they would not have to work with their hands, whereas Washington aimed for them to be capable of all sorts of labor and to not be ashamed of it.

Chapter 9 
"Anxious Days and Sleepless Nights": This chapter starts by stating how the people spent Christmas drinking and having a merry time, and not bearing in mind the true essence of Christmas. This chapter also discusses the institute's relationship with the locals of Tuskegee, the purchase and cultivation of a new farm, the erection of a new building, and the introduction of several generous donors, mostly northern. The death of Washington's first wife, Fannie N. Smith, is announced in this chapter. He had a daughter named Portia.

Chapter 10 
"A Harder Task Than Making Bricks Without Straw": In this chapter, Washington discusses the importance of having the students erect their own buildings: "Not a few times, when a new student has been led into the temptation of marring the looks of some building by lead pencil marks or by the cuts of a jack-knife, I have heard an old student remind him: 'Don't do that. That is our building. I helped put it up.'" The bricks reference in the title refers to the difficulty of forming bricks without some very necessary tools: money and experience. Through much labour, the students were able to produce fine bricks; their confidence then spilled over into other efforts, such as the building of vehicles.

Chapter 12 
"Raising Money": Washington travels north to secure additional funding for the institute with which he had much success. Two years after a meeting with one man, the Institute received a cheque of $10,000 and, from another couple, a gift of $50,000. Washington felt great pressure for his school and students to succeed, for failure would reflect poorly on the ability of the race. It is this time period Washington begins working with Andrew Carnegie, proving to Carnegie that this school was worthy of support. Not only did Washington find large donations helpful, but small loans were key which paid the bills and gave evidence to the community's faith in this type of education.

Chapter 13 
"Two Thousand Miles for a Five-Minute Speech": Washington marries again. His new wife is Olivia A. Davidson, first mentioned in Chapter 8. This chapter begins Washington's public speaking career; first at the National Education Association. His next goal was to speak before a Southern white audience. His first opportunity was limited by prior engagements and travel time, leaving him only five minutes to give his speech. Subsequent speeches were filled with purpose: when in the North he would be actively seeking funds, when in the South encouraged "the material and intellectual growth of both races." The result of one speech was the Atlanta Exposition Speech.

Chapter 14 
"The Atlanta Exposition Address": The speech that Washington gave to the Atlanta Exposition is printed here in its entirety. He also gives some explanation of the reaction to his speech: first, delight from all, then, slowly, a feeling among African Americans that Washington had not been strong enough in regards to the 'rights' of the race. In time, however, the African-American public would become, once again, generally pleased with Washington's goals and methods for African-American uplift.

Washington also speaks about the African-American clergy.  He also makes a much disputed statement about voting: "I believe it is the duty of the Negro – as the greater part of the race is already doing – to deport himself modestly in regard to political claims, depending upon the slow but sure influences that proceed from the possession of property, intelligence, and high character for the full recognition of his political rights.  I think that the according of the full exercise of political rights is going to be a matter of natural, slow growth, not an over-night, gourd-vine affair. I do not believe that the Negro should cease voting…but I do believe that in his voting he should more and more be influenced by those of intelligence and character who are his next-door neighbors…I do not believe that any state should make a law that permits an ignorant and poverty-stricken white man to vote, and prevents a black man in the same condition from voting. Such a law is not only unjust, but it will react, as all unjust laws do, in time; for the effect of such a law is to encourage the Negro to secure education and property. I believe that in time, through the operation of intelligence and friendly race relations, all cheating at the ballot box in the South will cease."

Chapter 15 
"The Secret Success in Public Speaking": Washington speaks again of the reception of his Atlanta Exposition Speech. He then goes on to give the reader some advice about public speaking and describes several memorable speeches.

Chapter 16 
"Europe": The author is married a third time, to Margaret James Murray. He speaks about his children. At this time, he and his wife are offered the opportunity to travel to Europe. Mixed emotions influenced their decision to go: Washington had always dreamed of traveling to Europe, but he feared the reaction of the people, for so many times had he seen individuals of his race achieve success and then turned away from the people. Mr. and Mrs. Washington enjoyed their trip, especially upon seeing their friend, Henry Tanner, an African-American artist, being praised by all classes. During their time abroad, the couple was also able to take tea with both Queen Victoria and Susan B. Anthony. Upon arriving back in the United States, Washington was asked to visit Charleston, West Virginia, near his former home in Malden.

Chapter 17
"Last Words": Washington describes his last interactions with General Armstrong and his first with Armstrong's successor, Rev. Dr. Hollis B. Frissell. The greatest surprise of his life was being invited to receive an honorary degree from Harvard University, the first awarded to an African American. Another great honor for Washington and Tuskegee was the visit of President William McKinley to the institute, an act which McKinley hoped to impress upon citizens his "interest and faith in the race." Washington then describes the conditions at Tuskegee Institute and his resounding hope for the future of the race.

Context 

The America of the 1880s and 1890s was one of white hostility toward African Americans. There was also the belief that the African-American race would not have been able to survive without the institution of slavery. Popular culture played in to the ideas of "black criminality and moral decline" as can be seen in the characters Jim_Crow_(character) and Zip Coon. When Washington began his writing and public speaking, he was fighting the notion that African Americans were inherently stupid and incapable of civilization. Washington's primary goal was to impress upon the audience the possibility of progress. Furthermore, living in the Black Belt, Booker T. Washington was vulnerable to mob violence and was, therefore, always mindful not to provoke the mob. As would be expected for a man in such precarious position, when violence erupted, he tried to stem his talk of equality and progress so as not to exacerbate the situation.

Lynching in the South at this time was prevalent as mobs of whites would take the law into their own hands and would torture and murder of dozens of men and women, including white men. The offenses of the victims included: "for being victor over a white man in a fight;" "protecting fugitive from posse;" "stealing seventy-five cents;" "expressing sympathy for mob's victim;" "for being father of boy who jostled white women." It is clear that any white person to show sympathy or offer protection for African-American victims would be labeled complicit himself and become vulnerable to violence by the mob. In 1901, Reverend Quincy Ewing of Mississippi charged the press and pulpit with uniting public sentiment against lynching. Lynching would continue into the 1950s and 1960s.

Some blame Washington's comparatively sheepish message upon a lack of desire for true African-American uplift. Some, taking into account the environment in which he was delivering his message, support Washington for making any public stance at all.

The relationship between Washington and his critics 
Since its publication, according to biographer Louis Harlan, Up From Slavery has been read as painting Booker T. Washington as both an "accommodationist and calculating realist seeking to carve out a viable strategy for black struggle amidst the nadir of race relations in the United States." While more contemporary ideas of black civil rights call for a more provocative approach, Washington was certainly a major figure in his time. Most critiques of him target his accommodationism, yet his private life was very much aimed at opposition through funding. The Atlanta Exposition speech shows his dual nature, giving everyone present something to agree with, no matter their intention. Washington deserves praise, in the view of historian Fitzhugh Brundage, for "seeking to be all things to all men in a multifaceted society." Many do argue against his being characterized as an accommodationist. For example, biographer Robert Norrell has written, "He worked too hard to resist and to overcome white supremacy to call him an accommodationist, even if some of his white-supremacist southern neighbors so construed some of his statements. Having conditions forced on him, with threat of destruction clearly the cost of resistance, does not constitute a fair definition of accommodation." Historians are thoroughly split over this characterization.

W. E. B. DuBois initially applauded Washington's stance on racial uplift. At one point he went as far as to say of the Atlanta Exposition speech: "here might be a real basis for the settlement between whites and blacks in the South." DuBois, in his book The Souls of Black Folk, congratulates Washington for accomplishing his first task, which was to earn the ear of the white southern population through a spirit of sympathy and cooperation. He also acknowledges the unstable situation in the south and the necessity for sensitivity to community feelings, yet he believes that Washington has failed in his sensitivity to African Americans. DuBois asserts that there are many educated and successful African Americans who would criticize the work of Washington, but they are being hushed in such a way as to impede "democracy and the safeguard of modern society." This is where their paths would diverge: Washington with his "Tuskegee Machine" and DuBois with the "Niagara Movement."

In 1905, the Niagara Movement issued a statement enumerating their demands against oppression and for civil rights. The Movement established itself as an entity entirely removed from Washington in conciliation, but rather a new, more radical course of action: "Through helplessness we may submit, but the voice of protest of ten million Americans must never cease to assail the ears of their fellows, so long as America is unjust." For a time, the Movement grew very successfully, but they lost their effectiveness when chapters began to disagree with one another. Eventually, the Movement's efforts translated into the development of the National Association for the Advancement of Colored People (NAACP).

Of course there were other participants in this discussion of the future of the African-American race, including that of W. H. Thomas, another African-American man. Thomas believed that African Americans were "deplorably bad" and that it would require a "miracle" to make any sort of progress. As in the case of Washington and DuBois, Washington and Thomas have areas of agreement, though DuBois would not so agree: that the best chance for an African American was in the areas of farming and country life. In some respects, it is hard to compare the two as each has different intentions.

Similarly, Thomas Dixon, author of The Clansman (1905), began a newspaper controversy with Washington over the industrial system, most likely to encourage talk of his upcoming book. He characterized the newfound independence of Tuskegee graduates as inciting competition: "Competition is war…. What will the [southern white man] do when put to the test? He will do exactly what his white neighbor in the North does when the Negro threatens his bread—kill him!"

In popular culture
In September 2011, a seven-part documentary television and DVD series was produced by LionHeart FilmWorks and director Kevin Hershberger using the title Up From Slavery.  The 315-minute series is distributed by Mill Creek Entertainment.  This series is not directly about the Booker T. Washington autobiography Up From Slavery, but tells the story of Black Slavery in America from the first arrival of African slaves at Jamestown in 1619 to the Civil War and the ratification of the 15th Amendment in 1870, which prohibits the government from denying a citizen the vote based on race, color, or previous condition of servitude (i.e., slavery), the third of the Reconstruction Amendments which finally ended the legitimacy of slavery in the United States.

See also
 List of books written by Booker T. Washington

References

External links

 

 
 
 
Available in PDF, HTML, and MP3 at the Lit2Go project at USF

1901 non-fiction books
20th-century history books
African-American autobiographies
Books by Booker T. Washington
+
Slave narratives
Slavery in the United States